Auricle is an Anglicization of Latin , from auris 'ear' and -cula, a diminutive suffix.

Auricle and auricula may refer to:

 Auricle Ensemble, chamber ensemble
 Auricular style, ornamental style based on parts of the human anatomy

Medicine
 Ear
 Auricle (anatomy), the external portion of the ear
 Auriculectomy, surgical removal of the ear
 Auricular branch (disambiguation), one of various nerves having to do with the ear or hearing
 Auricular muscles, muscles surrounding the ear
 A small conical or ear-shaped pouch that projects from each atrium (heart); also, in some older texts, the atrium itself
 Left atrial appendage
 Right atrial appendage

Biology
 Auricle (botany), an earlike projection on the base of a leaf or petal (in some cyclamen species, for example)
 An earlike projection at the base of the head of a planarium, which is sensitive to touch and the presence of certain chemicals 
 Primula auricula, a species of primula, including the hybrid cultivars known collectively as "auriculas"
 Auriculariales, an order of fungi
 Auricularia, a genus of fungi
 Auriculella, a genus of tropical land snails
 Auricula, a genus of extinct trilobites